Mary Lines (later Smith, 3 December 1893 – December 1978) was a British athlete. She competed in the long jump and 60 m – 800 m running events at the 1921 Women's Olympiad, 1922 Women's Olympiad and the 1922 Women's World Games and won nine gold, two silver and one bronze medals. In 1924 she participated at the 1924 Women's Olympiad and won the gold medal in the 100 yards running and the long jump. In 1922 she participated at the Women's Olympiad in Paris and won the gold medal in the 4×110 yds relay (with Lines as first runner, Nora Callebout, Daisy Leach and Gwendoline Porter) setting a new world record. In 1923 she participated in the first WAAA Championships becoming british champion both in running 100 yards, 440 yards and hurdling as well as in the long jump.

Lines studied at the Regent Street Polytechnic and worked as a waitress. She retired from competitions in 1924, and married Mr. Smith, who died in 1946. In 1971 she moved from London to Worthing, together with her two unmarried sisters. She died in 1978 in a traffic accident, aged 85. She was rushing to post her Christmas mail and ran in front of a van.

References

1893 births
1978 deaths
British female sprinters
British female long jumpers
Athletes from London
Women's World Games medalists